"Jaga Dia Untukku" (Take Care of Him for Me) is a second single by Malaysian artist, Siti Nurhaliza from her sixteenth solo album, Fragmen. Written by Rozisangdewi, the song is composed and recorded by Aubrey Suwito in January 2014.

First performed during her 2014 Dato' Siti Nurhaliza Live in Concert – Where the Heart is, the song revolves around her feelings when she learned that her husband was involved in a motorcycle accident in New Zealand in December 2012. The song was officially released on iTunes on 4 May 2014.

This song also used as the theme song for the Malaysian television drama series, Rindu Awak 200% aired on TV3.

Background and recording

The song was recorded in January 2014, in which it was inspired by her feelings when she learned her husband was involved in a motorcycle accident in December 2012. Much like other songs from Fragmen in which they describe the glimpses on her life, "Jaga Dia Untukku" is said by Siti to "translate all my feelings and those who were involved in it". Both composer (Aubrey Suwito) and the lyricist of "Jaga Dia Untukku", Rozisangdewi (Rozi Abdul Razak) were with her when the incident happened.

Composition and lyrics

At three minutes and twenty three seconds, "Jaga Dia Untukku" is a song with a moderately fast tempo. Written by Rozisangdewi, the song is composed by Aubrey Suwito. The lyric of the song is all inspired by her experiences in dealing with the news of the incident and her worries when taking care of him. According to Zaidi Mohamad of Berita Harian, its lyric, "portrays the sadness and the pain that appears to be close to Siti in reminiscing how she dealt with the trying moments when her husband was involved in a road accident around late December of 2012 in New Zealand".

Release and promotion
The song was first performed during her 2014 two-day fundraising concert, Dato' Siti Nurhaliza Live in Concert – Where the Heart is at Plenary Hall, Kuala Lumpur Convention Center on 8 and 9 February. For radio releases, Hot FM was the first radio station in Malaysia to broadcast the exclusive premiere for Malaysian listeners on 2 May.

Live performances
Apart from the debut of the song during the two-day 2014 Dato' Siti Nurhaliza Live in Concert – Where the Heart is on 8 and 9 February, the song was also performed during her two-day Secretaries' Week show, "Lebih Indah Bersama Datuk Siti Nurhaliza" on 15 and 16 April.

Credits and personnel 
Credits adapted from Fragmen booklet liner notes.

 Aubrey Suwito – record producer, composer, synth, production, arrangement, recording
 Dato' Siti Nurhaliza – vocals, background vocals
 Jay Franco (Sterling Sound) – mastering
 Juwita Suwito – background vocals
 Rozisangdewi (Rozi Abdul Razak) – lyricist
 Sunil Kumar – mixing

Chart performance

Awards

Format and track listing
 Digital download
 "Jaga Dia Untukku" – 3:23

Radio and release history

Footnotes
 Note 1:  Though it was reported that the song was released on iTunes on 4 April, the song was actually released on 4 May, two days after she promoted the song to radio stations.
 Note 2:  This single could be charted higher than stated here, since the data by the Music Weekly Asia start to be available much later after the release of the single on 4 May.

Explanatory notes

References 

2014 songs
Siti Nurhaliza songs
Universal Music Group singles
Song recordings produced by Siti Nurhaliza
2014 singles